A list of films produced in Italy in 1983 (see 1983 in film):

References

Sources

 
 
 

1983
Films
Italy